Varana is a small village of Patan district of Gujarat, India. This village was established around 800bc and the establisher was shree Bholadan funda, he's the great devotee of aai khodiyaar and by the grace of Devine power he established this village, in this village the population is around 1000-1500 families, currently the priest family of these village are from the blood lineage of founder. Than one more saint holly mother was in this family who was also great devotee of maa khodiyaar and has many super power so the late nawab of Radhanpur shree radhankhan ji was their devotee and given more four villages to the temple and priest family and than declared all of them revenue free Land,  later in 1952 all these land were distributed to the farmers by govt of India.  The village has a notable temple to Maa Khodiyar, a divinity worshipped by the Gadhvi (Charan) caste. Inhabitants of this village are primarily dependent on the farming of crops and vegetables.

Villages in Patan district

Charan